The 1944 Railway Cup Hurling Championship was the 18th series of the Railway Cup, an annual hurling tournament and organised by the Gaelic Athletic Association. The tournament took place between 13 February and 17 March 1944.

Four teams participated in the championship. These included all of the four historic provinces of Ireland, Connacht, Leinster, Munster and Ulster.

The tournament was won by Munster.

Results

Semi-final

Final

Top scorers

Overall

Single game

Sources

 Donegan, Des, The Complete Handbook of Gaelic Games (DBA Publications Limited, 2005).

Railway Cup Hurling Championship
Railway Cup Hurling Championship
Hurling